Cinnamon is the name of two Western characters in DC Comics, one inhabiting the wild west, the other living in the modern era. The character first appeared in Weird Western Tales #48 (September–October 1978), in a script written by Roger McKenzie, with artwork by Jack Abel (pencils) and Danny Bulanadi (inks).

Fictional character biography
Cinnamon is really Katherine "Kate" Manser, the daughter of a sheriff in a small Western town. After her father is killed by bank robbers, she is sent to an orphanage where she secretly trains herself in gunfighting. Upon leaving the orphanage, she becomes a bounty hunter to search for her father's killers. As well as being a crack shot, Cinnamon uses her father's sheriff badge as a shuriken.

In the third series of Hawkman, it is revealed that Cinnamon is a reincarnation of the Egyptian princess Chay-Ara. As such, she becomes the lover of Prince Khufu's reincarnation, the hero Nighthawk. When Cinnamon is attacked by the burglar "Gentleman Jim" Craddock, Nighthawk lynches him, wrongly believing he had sexually assaulted her and thereby tying his destiny to theirs. Cinnamon, along with Nighthawk, is killed by Matilda Dunney Roderic, presumably the latest incarnation of their eternal enemy Hath-Set.

A billboard in Wonder Woman #175 (which featured as many of DC's heroines as possible) advertises a musical entitled Cinnamon Get Your Gun, parodying Annie Get Your Gun.

The Silver-Age Cinnamon appeared in Weird Western Tales #48-49, and Justice League of America #198-199.

Modern Cinnamon
A modern-day version of the character is introduced in the miniseries Cinnamon: El Ciclo (2003), named by her parents after the historical gunslinger Cinnamon. Like the original, her father is a sheriff who is shot by bank robbers, leading her to seek revenge on the killers and become a bounty hunter.

She is seen in the Infinite Crisis special Villains United being contacted by J'onn J'onzz the Martian Manhunter. She is one of many recruited to fight various supervillain prison escapes. One page later, she is seen lying on the ground, unconscious, with a cut on her forehead.

Cinnamon does not appear again until Checkmate #24, where she is revealed as one of the organization's "Rooks".

The New 52
Cinnamon appears in All-Star Western in both its backups and in the main Jonah Hex story. Kate's father, a sheriff, was killed by the Robinson gang and she was sent to an orphanage, which she promptly ran away from. She was found by Ichi, a wandering Samurai, who taught her for three years before mysteriously disappearing. Kate ended up teaming up with Nighthawk after that. Cinnamon wears an Indian Medallion which grants her enhanced strength and healing abilities.

In other media
 Cinnamon makes a cameo appearance in the teaser for the Batman: The Brave and the Bold episode "The Siege of Starro!". This version is an associate of Jonah Hex and enemy of the Royal Flush Gang.
 Cinnamon appears in the Legends of Tomorrow episode "The Magnificent Eight", portrayed by Anna Deavere Smith. This version is from Salvation, Dakota Territory in 1871 and previously lost her partner, Hannibal Hawkes.

References

External links
 Bronze Age Cinnamon at the Unofficial Guide to the DC Universe
 Bronze Age Cinnamon at writeups.org
 Modern Age Cinnamon at the Unofficial Guide to the DC Universe
 Modern Age Cinnamon at writeups.org
List of Cinnamon versions at dc.wikia.com

Characters created by Roger McKenzie
American comics adapted into films
Comics characters introduced in 1978
Comics characters introduced in 2003
DC Comics Western (genre) characters
DC Comics female characters
Hawkgirl
Western (genre) bounty hunters
Western (genre) gunfighters